Ava (also Romanized as Ava)  is a city in Ava Rural District, Samalqan District, North Khorasan Province, Iran. At the 2006 census, its population was 1,727, in 430 families, Saeed RAHMATI .

References 

Populated places in Maneh and Samalqan County
Cities in North Khorasan Province